Linschoten may refer to:

 Lange Linschoten, a town in Utrecht, Netherlands
 Linschoten (village), in Utrecht, Netherlands
 Linschoten (river), in Utrecht, Netherlands
 Linschoten (surname)